The 2019–20 Big Ten women's basketball season began with practices in October 2019, followed by the start of the 2019–20 NCAA Division I women's basketball season in November 2019. The regular season ended in March, 2020.

The Big Ten tournament was be played at Bankers Life Fieldhouse in Indianapolis, Indiana in March 2020.

Head coaches

Coaching changes prior to the season

Penn State 
On March 9, 2019, Penn State fired head coach Coquese Washington. On April 3, 2019, the school hired Carolyn Kieger away from Marquette to serve as head coach.

Coaches

Notes: 
 All records, appearances, titles, etc. are from time with current school only. 
 Year at school includes 2019–20 season.
 Overall and Big Ten records are from time at current school and are through the beginning of the season. 
 Frese's ACC conference record excluded since Maryland began Big Ten Conference play in 2014–15.
 Stringer's Big East and American conference record excluded since Rutgers began Big Ten Conference play in 2014–15.

Preseason

Preseason conference poll 
The Big Ten released the preseason ranking on October 23, 2019, which featured a ranking by both media and coaches.

Preseason All-Big Ten 
On October 21, 2019, a panel of conference media selected a 10-member preseason All-Big Ten Team and Player of the Year.

Preseason watchlists
Below is a table of notable preseason watch lists.

Preseason national polls

Regular season

Rankings

Early season tournaments 
Nine of the 14 Big Ten teams participated in early season tournaments. All Big Ten teams participated in the ACC–Big Ten Women's Challenge against Atlantic Coast Conference teams, the 13th year for the event.

References